Golog (or Guoluo) Maqin Airport  is an airport serving Golog Tibetan Autonomous Prefecture in southeastern Qinghai Province, China.  It is located in Caozichang on the Dawutan Grassland. Construction began on 14 September 2012 with an estimated total investment of 1.24 billion yuan, and the airport started operations on 1 July 2016. Golog is the fifth civil airport in Qinghai.

Facilities
The airport has a 4,000-meter runway (class 4C), and a 3,000 square-meter terminal building.  It is projected to handle 150,000 passengers and 375 tons of cargo annually by 2020.

Airlines and destinations

See also
List of airports in China
List of the busiest airports in China
List of highest airports

References

Airports in Qinghai
Golog Tibetan Autonomous Prefecture
Airports established in 2016
2016 establishments in China